The World at Night (1996) is a novel by Alan Furst.

Plot summary

The story takes place in and around Paris between May 1940 and June 1941. Jean Casson is a French motion-picture producer who specializes in gangster films and who possesses no political views to speak of. When the Germans defeat and conquer his country, Casson at first tries to continue his life and career as if nothing had happened. But that proves impossible; when the Germans arrest a few of his friends and associates Casson finds himself helping others to hide or escape. He is seen talking to questionable people, and before long his line is tapped and his movements followed. Eventually Casson must choose between a life of resistance or no life at all.

Characters

Jean Casson starts the novel as a moderately successful film producer, with the creative and organizational skills such a career would demand. He considers himself to be something of an individualist and a cynic. The reader is led to doubt his self-evaluation because of his ability to win and keep the trust of a wide variety of people. It is, in fact, the dangers facing people close to him that forces him into action against the Germans.

Louis Fischfang is a screenwriter with whom Casson has often worked. As a Jew and a Communist, he is in considerable danger from the new regime. Casson helps him to disappear, putting himself beyond the point of no return in the process.

Citrine is an actress, an old girlfriend of Casson's with whom he resumes an affair. While she plays no important role in the plot, she personifies the happy, civilized old world that he finally decides is worth fighting for.

Colonel Guske is the Gestapo agent with whom Casson plays a lengthy game of cat-and-mouse. While not an evil or unlikable man himself, he is comfortable working within an evil system and goes about his job with lethal dedication.

Connections to Other Novels

While all of Furst's espionage novels are subtly connected, The World at Night is (as of 2007) the only one with a direct sequel. Jean Casson's adventures are continued in Red Gold.

Novels by Alan Furst
1996 American novels
American spy novels
American historical novels
Novels set during World War II
Novels set in Paris
Fiction set in 1940
Fiction set in 1941